Sar Khuni or Sarkhuni may refer to:
 Sar Khuni, Kohgiluyeh and Boyer-Ahmad